Zang Ha (born 14 March 1996) is a Chinese rower. He competed in the 2020 Summer Olympics.

References

1996 births
Living people
Chinese male rowers
Olympic rowers of China
Rowers at the 2020 Summer Olympics